Guerau or Guerao de Cabrera ( or ) may refer to:
Guerau I de Cabrera
Guerau II de Cabrera (died c. 1132)
Guerau III de Cabrera (died c. 1160)
Guerau IV de Cabrera (died 1228)